The 1948 Amateur World Series was the 10th Amateur World Series. It was held in Managua, Nicaragua from November 20 through December 12, 1948. The usually-powerful Cubans did not field a squad; in the wake of the integration of Organized Baseball, many top Cuban amateurs had been signed by MLB teams that had previously refused to sign the darker-skinned Cubans.

Final standings

References

Baseball World Cup, 1948
Baseball World Cup
1948
1948 in Nicaragua
Amateur World Series
Amateur World Series
Sport in Managua
Amateur World Series